Tom Fletcher Mayson VC (3 November 1893 – 21 February 1958) was an English recipient of the Victoria Cross, the highest and most prestigious award for gallantry in the face of the enemy that can be awarded to British and Commonwealth forces. He was awarded the VC for actions during the Battle of Pilckem Ridge of the Battle of Passchendaele.

Details
He was 23 years old, and a Lance-Sergeant in the 1/4th Battalion, The King's Own (Royal Lancaster) Regiment (part of the 55th (West Lancashire) Division), British Army during the First World War when the following deed took place for which he was awarded the VC.

On 31 July 1917 at Pilckem Ridge, Wieltje Salient, Belgium, when his platoon was held up by machine-gun fire, Lance-Sergeant Mayson, without waiting for orders, at once made for the gun which he put out of action with bombs, wounding four of the team; the remaining three of the team fled, pursued by Lance-Sergeant Mayson to a dug-out where he killed them. Later, when clearing up a strongpoint, this NCO again tackled a machine-gun single-handed, killing six of the team. Finally during an enemy counterattack he took charge of an isolated post and successfully held it until ordered to withdraw and his ammunition was exhausted.

The Medal
His Victoria Cross was on loan to Whicham Church from where it was given to the Kings Own Royal Regimental Museum. in Lancaster, Lancashire

References

Monuments to Courage (David Harvey, 1999)
The Register of the Victoria Cross (This England, 1997)
VCs of the First World War - Passchendaele 1917 (Stephen Snelling, 1998)

External links
Location of grave and VC medal (Cumbria)
Royal Lancaster Regiment

King's Own Royal Regiment soldiers
British Army personnel of World War I
British World War I recipients of the Victoria Cross
1893 births
1958 deaths
People from Millom
British Army recipients of the Victoria Cross
Military personnel from Cumberland
Burials in Cumbria